Timur Gumerov (born 26 March 1992) is a Uzbekistani road and track cyclist. In 2015, Gumerov competed in the omnium event at the UCI Track Cycling World Championships, finished third at the Uzbekistan National Time Trial Championships and won the gold medal in the omnium at the Asian Cycling Championships.

References

External links

1992 births
Living people
Uzbekistani track cyclists
Uzbekistani male cyclists
Place of birth missing (living people)
Cyclists at the 2014 Asian Games
Asian Games competitors for Uzbekistan
21st-century Uzbekistani people